Aser Pierrick Dipanda Dicka (born 18 February 1989) is a Cameroonian professional footballer who plays as a forward.

Career
Born in Douala, Dipanda has spent the majority of his career playing in Spain with Valencia B, La Roda, Olímpic de Xàtiva, and Alzira. Dipanda then moved to India where he joined DSK Shivajians of the I-League. He made his debut for the club on 17 January 2016 against Sporting Goa. In September 2019, he was signed up by Minerva Punjab FC to play in the I-League.

In 2021, he joined newly formed Delhi FC and appeared in the 130th edition of Durand Cup. He later appeared in the 2021 I-League Qualifiers, in which they finished on third position.

Career statistics

Club

Honours
Individual
Best Striker of Hero I-League: 2016–17
Best Striker of Hero I-League: 2017–18
2021 FD Senior Division Golden Boot (10 goals)

Mohun Bagan
Calcutta Football League: 2018–19
Minerva Punjab
Punjab State Super League: 2019

References

External links 

Profile at Instagram

1989 births
Living people
Footballers from Douala
Association football forwards
Cameroonian footballers
Segunda División B players
Tercera División players
Valencia CF Mestalla footballers
CD Olímpic de Xàtiva footballers
UD Alzira footballers
I-League players
Shillong Lajong FC players
DSK Shivajians FC players
Mohammedan SC (Kolkata) players
Mohun Bagan AC players
Expatriate footballers in Spain
Expatriate footballers in India
Cameroonian expatriate sportspeople in Spain
Cameroonian expatriate sportspeople in India
La Roda CF players
CF Gandía players